William Humble Ward, 2nd Earl of Dudley,  (25 May 1867 – 29 June 1932), was a British aristocrat, politician, and military officer who served as the fourth Governor-General of Australia, in office from 1908 to 1911. He was previously Lord Lieutenant of Ireland from 1902 to 1905, and also a government minister under Lord Salisbury.

Dudley was the son of William Ward, 1st Earl of Dudley, and succeeded to the earldom at the age of 17. He inherited a substantial fortune and the palatial family seat at Witley Court. Dudley sat with the Conservative Party in the House of Lords, and was Parliamentary Secretary to the Board of Trade from 1895 to 1902. He was appointed Lord Lieutenant of Ireland when Arthur Balfour came to power, and was regarded as a competent administrator. His time in Dublin led to his inclusion as a character in James Joyce's Ulysses.

In part due to the urging of King Edward VII, a longtime acquaintance, Dudley was appointed Governor-General of Australia in 1908. His extravagance and pomposity made him unpopular among the general public, and his attempts to interfere in political matters rankled both prime ministers he worked with (Andrew Fisher and Alfred Deakin). Deakin regarded him as doing "nothing really important, nothing thoroughly, nothing consistently [...] very ineffective and not very popular". He was recalled to England after less than three years in office.

Dudley took command of the Queen's Own Worcestershire Hussars in 1913. He had first joined the army as a young man, and during the Second Boer War served with the Imperial Yeomanry. In World War I, Dudley commanded the Hussars for the initial stages of the Gallipoli campaign, but he returned to England before its conclusion. He was later attached to the headquarters staff of the 40th Division, and retired with the rank of lieutenant-colonel. Dudley had seven children with his first wife, and was succeeded in the earldom by his oldest son William.

Background and education
Dudley was born in London, the son of William Ward, 1st Earl of Dudley, and Georgina, daughter of Sir Thomas Moncrieff, 7th Baronet. He was educated at Eton. He visited Australia in 1886–87 as part of a yachting cruise. Dudley became part of the social circle of the Prince of Wales (later King Edward VII), who attended his wedding to Rachel Gurney in 1891. He was appointed a deputy lieutenant for Worcestershire in 1893 and from 1895 to 1896 he was Mayor of Dudley.

Early military service
Dudley joined the Queen's Own Worcestershire Hussars as a supernumerary lieutenant on 18 April 1885 and was promoted to captain on 2 June 1888 and major on 23 September 1893. After the outbreak of the Second Boer War, he was seconded for service as a Deputy Assistant Adjutant General for the Imperial Yeomanry in early 1900, and left for South Africa in the SS Scot in late January that year. He was present at operations in the Orange Free State in February to May 1900. Some of the actions he was involved with were at Poplar Grove, Driefontein, Vet River, and Zand River. From May to June 1900 he was present at operations in the Transvaal. Some of the actions he was involved with were Johannesburg, Pretoria, and Diamond Hill. He then return to the United Kingdom, and in July to November 1900 he was involved with the suppression of the Irish troubles in Belfast.

He was transferred from the Imperial Yeomanry to the Territorial Force on the latter's formation on 1 April 1908, and was seconded for service with the Colonial Office on 9 April that year, when he was posted to Australia.

Political career

Dudley sat on the Conservative benches in the House of Lords and served under Lord Salisbury as Parliamentary Secretary to the Board of Trade from 1895 to 1902.

After Arthur Balfour succeeded as Prime Minister, Lord Dudley was on 11 August 1902 sworn a member of the Privy Council, and appointed Lord Lieutenant of Ireland. He was sworn in and formally installed as such in a ceremony at Dublin Castle on 16 August 1902, and was also appointed Grand Master of the Order of St. Patrick, as was customary for the Lord Lieutenant of Ireland. Through his years in Ireland, he displayed great extravagance but also some political and administrative ability. The Land Purchase (Ireland) Act 1903 and his cooperation with George Wyndham on a devolution scheme to deal with the Home Rule question were among important milestones. He is immortalized in Joyce's description of his Vice-Regal progress through Dublin in Ulysses. During his first visit to Belfast, in November 1902, he laid the foundation stone of the Belfast Municipal Technical Institute.

Governor-General of Australia

As a Conservative, Dudley could not have expected preferment from the Liberal government which came to office in 1905, but King Edward VII pressed the Prime Minister, Sir Henry Campbell-Bannerman, to offer Dudley the post of Governor-General of Australia. Campbell-Bannerman agreed, since there was apparently no suitable Liberal candidate available. Dudley was appointed on 9 May 1908 and arrived in Sydney on 9 September. He soon established a reputation for pomp, ceremony and extravagance which was unwelcome to many Australians, particularly the Labor Party and the radical press such as The Bulletin. Not long after his arrival, he found himself swearing in a Labor cabinet under Andrew Fisher, so the Labor Party's disapproval of his vice-regal style became an important issue.

The new Governor-General soon found himself involved in another controversy. It was part of Labor policy to establish an independent Australian navy. The Liberal opposition, on the other hand, supported the campaign for Australia to raise money to build ships for the Royal Navy: the so-called Dreadnought campaign. So when Dudley made a speech in support of the Dreadnought campaign, he was straying into party politics, leading to a tense relationship with Fisher. In 1909 Fisher's minority government resigned, and Dudley refused him an early election. The Liberals returned to office under Alfred Deakin, solving Dudley's immediate problems. But although Fisher was careful not to criticise Dudley in public, the Governor-General had acquired a reputation as "anti-Labor," which made him unpopular with half the Australian electorate.

In April 1910 Labor won a sweeping election victory and Fisher returned to power. Relations between Governor-General and Prime Minister were soon once again frosty. Dudley's insistence on maintaining two very expensive Government Houses, in Sydney and Melbourne, on travelling around the country in vice-regal pomp, and on chartering a steam yacht to circumnavigate the continent, infuriated Fisher, a frugal Scottish socialist. By October Dudley had recognised the impossibility of his position and asked to be recalled. He left Australia on 31 July 1911, unmarked by any official ceremony. Alfred Deakin wrote of him:

Later military service
On 20 January 1912 Lord Dudley rejoined the establishment of the Worcestershire Hussars, and on 10 November 1913 he was promoted to succeed Sir Henry Foley Grey as lieutenant-colonel commanding the regiment. By this time he was convinced that there was going to be another war in Europe and formed a permanent staff of instructors to train the regiment in musketry. When war was declared in 1914, the Worcestershires formed part of the 1st South Midland Mounted Brigade, under the commander of Brigadier E. A. Wiggin. The Brigade was ordered to Egypt and was based in Chatby Camp, near Alexandria, by April 1915. The brigade didn't see any action until they were ordered to prepare to fight as infantry in August. It was at this time that the men were sent to Suvla Bay, and took part in the Battle of Scimitar Hill on 21 August. The regiment were in support of the Anzacs in their attempt to break through the Turkish defenses. This attack failed miserably, and they were evacuated in January 1916. Lord Dudley had already left the regiment on 22 August 1915, when he was seconded and posted to East Mudros as Commandant, where he remained until 23 November. In 1916, Lord Dudley was attached to the headquarters staff of the 40th Infantry Division. He was transferred to the Territorial Force Reserve as a lieutenant-colonel on 23 July 1916 and relinquished his commission on 30 September 1921.

Yachting 
On inheriting his Earldom he embarked in 1885-1886 on a round the world cruise in the 374 ton Steam Yacht Marchesa, built by Lobnitz, this voyage including meeting the Emperor of Brazil, and had a stop at Sydney to refit.

In 1892 he bought the 5-rater Dacia - one of the first Charles E Nicholson designs, from Hercules Langrishe. He then commissioned Vigorna, also from Camper and Nicholsons which was less successful. His next yacht Inyoni was more successful.

During his time as Viceroy of Ireland he was a member of the Dublin Bay and Lough Erne sailing clubs, as well as the Royal Yacht Squadron.

Marriages and children

Lord Dudley married firstly in 1891 Rachel Anne Gurney (born 8 August 1868), daughter of Charles Henry Gurney (born 5 November 1833), and Alice Prinsep, and maternal granddaughter of Henry Thoby Prinsep (1793–1878) and Sara Monckton Pattle (Calcutta, 1816–Brighton, 1887). Her sister Laura Gurney was the wife of Sir Thomas Herbert Cochrane Troubridge, 4th Baronet.

They had seven children:

 Lady Gladys Honor Ward (born 1892, died 5 December 1961)
 William Humble Eric Ward, 3rd Earl of Dudley (born 20 January 1894, died 26 December 1969)
 Lady Morvyth Lillian Ward (born 1896, died 11 March 1959)
 Lt Col Hon Roderick John Ward (born 13 April 1902, died 2 October 1952)
 Lady Alexandra Patrica Ward (born 24 August 1904, died 7 July 1964)
 Gp Capt Hon Edward Frederick Ward (born 20 November 1907, died 1987)
 George Reginald Ward, 1st and last Viscount Ward of Witley (born 20 November 1907, died 15 June 1988)

Lady Dudley took an interest in medical welfare. In Ireland, in 1903, she set up the Lady Dudley Nurses scheme to serve isolated rural communities in counties Connemara, Mayo, Donegal, and Kerry. In Australia, in 1908, she set up a similar scheme which was a forerunner of the Flying Doctor service. 
On the outbreak of World War I Lady Dudley established the Australian Voluntary Hospital from doctors and nurse in London.  She drowned on 26 June 1920, aged 51, while on a visit to Connemara.

Lord Dudley remarried, on 30 April 1924, actress Gertie Millar, daughter of John Millar, .

Lord Dudley died of cancer in London on 29 June 1932 at age 65 and was succeeded by his eldest son, William. Gertie, Countess of Dudley, died in April 1952. The English actresses Georgina Ward and Rachel Ward were his granddaughter and great-granddaughter  respectively.

Honours and awards
Grand Master of The Most Illustrious Order of Saint Patrick, invested as Grand Master on 16 August 1902, on the day he was installed as Lord Lieutenant of Ireland, and handed over the insignia when he resigned in December 1905. He was never appointed a knight of the order.
GCB: Knight Grand Cross of the Most Honourable Order of the Bath
GCMG: Knight Grand Cross of the Order of St Michael and St George
GCVO: Royal Victorian Order, Knight Grand Cross
Most Venerable Order of the Hospital of Saint John of Jerusalem, Knight's badge
Territorial Decoration, with a riband bar
Queen Victoria's Diamond Jubilee Medal for Mayors
King Edward VII Coronation Medal Medal
King George V Coronation Medal Medal
Queen's South Africa Medal, 5 clasps (Cape Colony, Johannesburg, Driefontein, Diamond Hill, Belfast)

Arms

References
Chris Cunneen, 'Dudley, second Earl of (1867–1932)', Australian Dictionary of Biography, Volume 8, MUP, 1981, pp 347–348. Additional sources listed by the Australian Dictionary of Biography: 
Dictionary of National Biography, 1931–40
'High Court of Justice: Lady Dudley's Separation Allowance', The Times (London), 7 Nov 1918, p 2
'Death of Lady Dudley', Times (London), 28 June 1920, p 16
'Obituary: Lord Dudley', Times (London), 30 June 1932, p 16
C. Cunneen, The Role of the Governor-General in Australia 1901–1927 (PhD thesis, Australian National University, 1973)
Alfred Deakin papers, MS 1540/19/275 (National Library of Australia).

External links

1867 births
1932 deaths
Governors-General of Australia
Lords Lieutenant of Ireland
British Army personnel of the Second Boer War
British Army personnel of World War I
Deputy Lieutenants of Worcestershire
Earls in the Peerage of the United Kingdom
2
Knights Grand Cross of the Order of the Bath
Knights Grand Cross of the Order of St Michael and St George
Knights Grand Cross of the Royal Victorian Order
Members of London County Council
Members of the Privy Council of the United Kingdom
Conservative Party (UK) Baronesses- and Lords-in-Waiting
William
Worcestershire Yeomanry officers
Parliamentary Secretaries to the Board of Trade
Mayors of places in the West Midlands (county)
Politicians awarded knighthoods
People educated at Eton College